Jeffrey Richard de Corban Evans, 4th Baron Mountevans,  (born 13 May 1948), is a London shipbroker and British hereditary peer, who served as Lord Mayor of London from 2015 to 2016.

Lord Mountevans was elected a City Alderman in 2007, served as Sheriff in 2012–2013 and was Lord Mayor for 2015–2016. He sits in the House of Lords as an hereditary peer, having been elected in the crossbench hereditary peers' by-election of July 2015, following the retirement of William Lloyd George, 3rd Viscount Tenby.

Biography 
The younger son of Richard, 2nd Baron Mountevans, he succeeded to his title on the death without issue in 2014 of his elder brother Broke, 3rd Baron Mountevans. He speaks fluent Norwegian as his grandmother on his father's side was a native of Norway.

Previously styled The Hon. Jeffrey Evans, he was educated at Pangbourne College, before going up to Pembroke College, Cambridge, where he read economics and took the degree of MA (Cantab).

The City and shipping
Lord Mountevans is a director of gas chartering at Clarkson plc and a member of the Baltic Exchange. He served as Prime Warden of the Shipwrights' Company for 2006–2007 before his election as Alderman for the City Ward of Cheap in 2007, and was Sheriff of London for 2012–2013. At the Michaelmas Common Hall in 2015 he was elected to serve as Lord Mayor for the ensuing year, taking office on 13 November 2015. He is also a liveryman of the Goldsmiths' and World Traders' Companies.

Mountevans' many charitable involvements include being a Trustee of Seafarers UK, a leading national maritime charity, President of the City of London Sea Cadets and a Council Member of the White Ensign Association, which offers advice to all ranks of the Royal Navy and Royal Marines on employment, pensions and other financial matters.

Family
In 1972 he married Juliet née Wilson, daughter of John Wilson, 2nd Baron Moran, and lives at Kensington, London.

Lord and Lady Mountevans have two sons: The Hon. Alexander Evans (born 1975), heir apparent to the family title, and The Hon. Julian Evans (born 1977).

Styles 

 Jeffrey Evans (1948–1958)
 The Hon. Jeffrey Evans (1958–2007)
 Alderman The Hon. Jeffrey Evans (2007–2014)
 Alderman The Rt Hon. The Lord Mountevans (2014–2015)
 The Rt. Hon. Lord Mayor The Lord Mountevans (2015–2016)
 Alderman The Rt Hon. The Lord Mountevans (2016–present)

Honours
  KJStJ (2015)
 SBStJ (2013)
 Hon. FICS (2013)

Arms

See also
Baron Mountevans
City of London Corporation
House of Lords
Shipbroking

References

External links 

 Past Prime Warden Shipwright The Lord Mountevans
 Lord Mayor Mountevans' overseas programme 
 Profile, hereditarypeers.com. Accessed 10 January 2023.

1948 births
Living people
People from Kensington
People educated at Pangbourne College
Alumni of Pembroke College, Cambridge
English financial businesspeople
Councilmen and Aldermen of the City of London
Local government in the United Kingdom
Knights of Justice of the Order of St John
Sheriffs of the City of London
English people of Welsh descent
English justices of the peace
Barons in the Peerage of the United Kingdom
Crossbench hereditary peers
21st-century lord mayors of London
21st-century British politicians
Hereditary peers elected under the House of Lords Act 1999
Younger sons of barons
Shipbrokers